The Ministry of Citizen Protection is the government department responsible for Greece's public security services, i.e. the Hellenic Police, the Hellenic Fire Service, Hellenic (Corrections) Prison System, the Agrarian Police and the General Secretariat for Civil Protection.

The ministry existed until 2007 as the Ministry of Public Order. On 19 September 2007, it was merged with the Ministry of the Interior, Public Administration and Decentralization and reduced to a General Secretariat within the Ministry of the Interior. On 7 October 2009, it was revived as the Ministry of Citizen Protection (Υπουργείο Προστασίας του Πολίτη) and was eventually renamed as the Ministry of Public Order and Citizen Protection on 21 June 2012. Following the electoral victory of Syriza in January 2015, it was subordinated to the Ministry of the Interior and Administrative Reconstruction and was headed by an Alternate Minister (Αναπληρωτής Υπουργός). In August 2018, it was reorganized as an independent ministry and was revived as the Ministry of Citizen Protection (Υπουργείο Προστασίας του Πολίτη).

List of Ministers since 1974

Ministers for Public Order (1974–1985)

Ministers of the Interior and Public Order (1985–1986)

Ministers for Public Order (1986–2007)

Ministers for Citizen Protection (2009–2012)

Ministers for Public Order and Citizen Protection (2012–15)

Alternate Ministers for Public Order and Citizen Protection (2015–2018)

Ministers for Citizen Protection (since 2018)

External links
Ministry website

Government ministries of Greece
Lists of government ministers of Greece
Law enforcement in Greece
Greece